Callia purpureipennis is a species of beetle in the family Cerambycidae. The beetle was first described by Johannes von Nepomuk Franz Xaver Gistel in 1848. Its known habitat is in Brazil.

References

Calliini
Beetles described in 1848